Francisco Antonio de Borja-Centelles y Ponce de Léon (27 March 1659 - 3 April 1702) was a Spanish cardinal and member of the Borgia family. He served as Bishop of Calahorra y La Calzada-Logroño (1701-1702) and Archbishop of Burgos (1702).

He was born in Sardinia in 1659, where his family had interests.  He was the son of Francisco Carlos de Borja, IX Duke of Gandía, and María Ana Ponce de León, daughter of Rodrigo Ponce de León, 4th Duke of Arcos.

Ecclesiastical career
He was named cardinal by Pope Innocent XII in the consistory of June 21, 1700 .  In June 1701 it obtained the bishopric of Calahorra, and in November of that year it happened to the archbishopric of Burgos, of which did not take possession by passing away suddenly the 4 of April 1702, being buried in the Church of the Company of Jesus next to his ancestor San Francisco de Borja.

References

External links and additional sources
 (for Chronology of Bishops)
 (for Chronology of Bishops)
 (for Chronology of Bishops) 
 (for Chronology of Bishops) 
Biographical Dictionary - Consistory of June 21, 1700

1659 births
1702 deaths
Francisco Antonio
18th-century Spanish cardinals